Dafina may refer to:

Dafina, also known as cholent or hamin, a traditional Jewish stew
Dafina Books, an imprint of Kensington Books

People
Dafina Zeqiri, Kosovo-Albanian singer-songwriter
Dafina Zeqiri (composer), Kosovo-Albanian composer of orchestral, chamber, and choral music 
Dafina Memedov, Albanian football midfielder

See also
Davina (disambiguation)